Angk Prasat Commune is a khum (commune) in Kiri Vong District, Takéo Province, Cambodia.

Administration 
As of 2019, Angk Prasat Commune has 10 phums (villages) as follows.

References 

Communes of Takéo province
Kiri Vong District